André Le Goupil (7 January 1931 – 17 February 2023) was a French equestrian. He competed in two events at the 1968 Summer Olympics in. Mexico City.

Le Goupil died on 17 February 2023, at the age of 92.

References

External links

1931 births
2023 deaths
French male equestrians
Olympic equestrians of France
Equestrians at the 1968 Summer Olympics
Sportspeople from Manche